Michal Pšurný (born February 23, 1986) is a Czech professional ice hockey right winger.

Pšurný played a total of 115 games in the Czech Extraliga with HC Zlín and HC České Budějovice. He moved to the Manchester Phoenix in the English Premier Ice Hockey League on September 14, 2012 and stayed for three seasons, helping them win the Playoff Championship in 2013 and the League Championship in 2014.

His twin brother Roman Pšurný is also a professional ice hockey player and was drafted by the New York Rangers in 2004.

References

External links

1986 births
Living people
Czech ice hockey forwards
HC Dukla Jihlava players
SHK Hodonín players
SK Horácká Slavia Třebíč players
LHK Jestřábi Prostějov players
Kootenay Ice players
Manchester Phoenix players
Medicine Hat Tigers players
BK Mladá Boleslav players
Motor České Budějovice players
HC Olomouc players
IHC Písek players
TMH Polonia Bytom players
Scorpions de Mulhouse players
HC Slovan Ústečtí Lvi players
Sportspeople from Zlín
HC Vrchlabí players
PSG Berani Zlín players
Czech expatriate ice hockey players in Canada
Czech expatriate ice hockey players in Germany
Czech expatriate sportspeople in England
Czech expatriate sportspeople in France
Czech expatriate sportspeople in Poland
Expatriate ice hockey players in England
Expatriate ice hockey players in France
Expatriate ice hockey players in Poland
Czech twins
Twin sportspeople